is a professional Go player.

Biography 
Anzai became a professional in 2003. He is currently 7 dan.

Promotion record

References

External links
 Nihon Ki-in profile 

Japanese Go players
1985 births
Living people